Adétòkunbọ̀ is both a surname and a given name of Yoruba origin meaning "the crown or royalty from across the seas" or "the crown or royalty from a foreign land". The name consists of two parts: Adé "crown", which is also found in other Yoruba names such as Adéwálẹ̀, and Tòkunbọ from ti òkun bọ̀ "came (by) sea (and) arrived", which is often applied to children born outside of Africa.

Surname
Basketball: brothers from Greece playing in the G League or NBA
 Alex Antetokounmpo (born 2001), Greek basketball player for the Wisconsin Herd (affiliate of the Milwaukee Bucks) in the NBA G League 
 Giannis Antetokounmpo (born 1994), Greek basketball player for the Milwaukee Bucks in the NBA
 Kostas Antetokounmpo (born 1997), Greek basketball player for the Chicago Bulls in the NBA
 Thanasis Antetokounmpo (born 1992), Greek basketball player for the Milwaukee Bucks in the NBA

Given name
 Adetokunbo Ademola (1906–1993), Nigerian jurist
 Adetokunbo Kayode (born 1958), Nigerian politician
 Adetokunbo Lucas (1931–2020), Nigerian physician
 Adetokunbo Ogundeji (born 1998), American football player

Notes

Yoruba given names
Yoruba-language surnames